Umikaze (海風 ”Sea Breeze”) can refer to:

Umikaze-class destroyer - a World War I destroyer class in the Imperial Japanese Navy
Japanese destroyer Umikaze (1910) - The lead ship of the Umikaze-class destroyers
Japanese destroyer Umikaze (1936) - a World War II destroyer in the Imperial Japanese Navy
Office Umikaze - a Japanese talent agency